Wang Xiaosong (born 1964) is a Chinese artist and professor. Having studied in Beijing and Berlin from 1983 to 1997, Wang uses a confluence of Chinese and Western art in his works.

Early life and education 
Wang was born in Wuhan, Hubei in 1964. After the beginning of the Cultural Revolution in 1966, his father was involved, while Wang returned to his hometown in Dalian, Liaoning in 1969.

Since childhood, Wang was fond of creating clay figures. His grandfather and grandmother were a craftsman and a housewife, respectively. His mother was a singer in Wuhan. One of his uncles played the piano, another played the flute, and his aunt was a dancer. Wang noted in an interview that his "living environment was full of the arts".

Wang began to learn drawing and calligraphy as a teenager. He attended Wuhan Experimental School, where he "practiced sketching and colors". In 1983, he began his studies at the Central Academy of Arts & Design in Beijing—now known as the Academy of Arts and Design at Tsinghua University. Under the supervision of professors Liu Jude and Yu Binnan, Wang majored in Book Decoration, graduating in 1987.

Career 
In 1990, Wang moved to Berlin, where he majored in Visual Communication at the Berlin University of the Arts with professors Spohn and Bernhard Boës. In 1992, he settled in Berlin, working as a freelance artist and designer. In 1994, Wang was accepted as a member of the German Artists Society (Association of German Artists).

In 1996, he became a Director and Cultural General Supervisor at the Germany-China Cultural Exchanges Association. From 1997 to 2003, he taught at Victor Gollancz Volkshochschule Steglitz in Berlin. In 2003, he moved back to China and has since served as a doctoral advisor, professor, and dean of the Visual Communication Design Department in the Academy of Fine Arts at Zhejiang University.

In addition to his activities as an artist and lecturer, Wang, in cooperation with Berlin architect Peter Ruge, maintains an architectural office in Hangzhou, where numerous new buildings and urban designs are conceived, organized, and realized.

In 2011, Wang's work, Making Life, was shown at the Venice Biennale. Making Life was conceived as an antithesis to the official Chinese pavilion, and attracted media attention. Wang's works are part of various notable collections, such as the National Art Museum of China, the Ludwig Museum Koblenz, and the Wiener Künstlerhaus. Wang is represented in Europe exclusively by the Schütz Fine Art gallery in Vienna.

Work

Style 
Wang is an abstractionist. His style has been described as "breaking the boundary between painting and sculpture".

Themes 
Wang's early work occupies an ambivalent middle ground between the abstract (textures, shapes, and patterns) and the figurative (wounds and anthropomorphic figures on the surface). In some of his works, such as Offenes China, cuts similar to those used by Lucio Fontana break the unity of the canvas, giving it a three-dimensional dynamic.

The concepts of generation and decease are central in Wang's oeuvre, which becomes political when it addresses overpopulation, mass control, and uniformity.

In Wang's later works, such as Ohne Titel (blau), these themes remain at the center of his oeuvre. However, for the artist, there is no more need to rely on representative symbols of birth and annihilation, such as cuts and people.

Selected exhibitions 

Art Vienna, Vienna, Austria, Schütz Fine Art-Chinese Department, 2019
Art & Antique Hofburg Wien, Vienna, Austria, Schütz Fine Art-Chinese Department, 2018
FAIR FOR ART VIENNA, Vienna, Austria, Schütz Fine Art-Chinese Department, 2018
Art & Antique Hofburg Wien, Vienna, Austria, Schütz Fine Art-Chinese Department, 2017
Art & Antique Residenz Salzburg, Salzburg, Austria, Schütz Fine Art-Chinese Department, 2016
Art Salzburg, Salzburg, Austria, Schütz Fine Art-Chinese Department, 2016
WIKAM Fair at the Künstlerhaus Vienna, Vienna, Austria, Schütz Fine Art-Chinese Department, 2015
Art & Antique Hofburg Wien, Vienna, Austria, Schütz Fine Art-Chinese Department, 2015
Art & Antique Residenz Salzburg, Salzburg, Austria, Schütz Fine Art-Chinese Department, 2015
Olympia International Art & Antiques Fair, London, UK, Schütz Fine Art-Chinese Department, 2015
Olympia International Art & Antiques Fair, London, UK, Schütz Fine Art-Chinese Department, 2014
LAPADA Art & Antiques Fair, London, UK, Schütz Fine Art, Schütz Fine Art-Chinese Department, 2014
ART.FAIR Köln, Cologne, Germany, Schütz Fine Art-Chinese Department, 2014
Art Salzburg, Salzburg, Austria, Schütz Fine Art-Chinese Department, 2014
Art Beijing, Art Solo 14, Taipei, 2014
China Arte Brasil, São Paulo, Brazil, 2014
Wang Xiaosong, Solo Exhibition, Pine's Art Gallery, Taipei, 2013
Unruly Ants, Künstlerhaus Wien, Vienna, Austria, 2012-2013
Unruly Ants, Pallazzo Medici Riccardi, Florence, Italy, 2012-2013
Unruly Ants, Ludwig Museum, Koblenz, Germany, 2012-2013
Unruly Ants, Kunsthalle St. Annen, Lübeck, Germany, 2012-2013
Art & Antique Residenz Salzburg, Salzburg, Austria, Schütz Fine Art-Chinese Department, 2012
54. Biennale dell’Arte 2011, Venice, Italy, 2011
Empty Layer: Wang Xiaosong, Shanghai Duolun Museum of Modern Art, Shanghai, China, 2009
Interaction: Exhibition of Contemporary Chinese Oil Paintings, Wuhan Art Museum, Wuhan, China, 2008
Mix & Match Vision: Invitation for 2008, Contemporary Art Communication across Taiwan Straits, Wu Jiao Chao 800 Art Space, Shanghai, China, 2008
Exhibition of HD Schrader & Wang Xiaosong, Art Studio, Hamburg, Germany, 2007
Art Beijing 2007, Beijing, China, 2007
„Return“; Mountains and Rivers: A Tour of Exhibitions of Contemporary Chinese and German Artists, Lübeck Museum, Lübeck, Germany, 2007
Imagery Mt. Wuyi: The Debut Interactive Creation of Chinese, Vis-a-vis German Artists, International Travelling Exhibitions, Sanshang, Art Beijing, Shanghai Art Museum, China, 2006
Pressure and Power in Changeable Era, International Art Camp in Song Village, Beijing, China, 2006
Imagery Mt. Wuyi: Exhibition of the debut interactive creation of Chinese vis-a-vis German Artists, Villages in Mt. Wuyi, Wuyi Mountain Villa, Fujian, China, 2005
Not Dawn Yet, The Courtyard Gallery, Beijing, China, 2005
10th National Artworks Exhibition, Beijing, China, 2004
19th Warsaw International Biennial of Posters, Warsaw, Poland, 2004
Kamakura Geijutsu-kan, Kamakura Museum, Kamakura, Japan, 2002
International Biennial of New Watercolor Paintings, Kunststation, Kleinsassen, Germany, 2001
Open Studio, Nord Gallery, Berlin, Germany, 2000
Allegories of the Soul, Willy-Brandt-Haus, Berlin, Germany, 2000
Allegories of the Soul, Larissa Contemporary Art Centre, Larissa, Greece, 1999
International Biennial of New Watercolor Paintings, Kunststation, Kleinsassen, Germany, 1999
Five Artists from China, Buch Messe Leipzig, Germany, 1999
Tell Us No Tales, Kulturinsel Galerie, Berlin, Germany, 1999
Exhibition, Galerie Just Art, Berlin, Germany, 1998
Art Initiative, C4 Galerie, Berlin, Germany, 1998
Celestial Axis, Prisma-Haus Berlin. Artist and Organizer, Berlin, Germany, 1998
Color and Vision, Werkstatt der Kultur, Berlin, Germany, 1998
Side by Side: Chinese Artists in Berlin, Artist and Organizer, Berlin, Germany, 1997
Exhibition in Robert-Koch-Institut Berlin, Berlin, Germany, 1995
Painting and Chinese Ink Drawings, Ausstellungshalle Deidesheim, Deidesheim, Germany, 1994
First National Exhibition of Fine Arts and Sports, National Art Museum of China, Beijing, China, 1986
The 10th National Artworks Exhibition, Beijing, China, 1986

Selected works 
 Eruption 1, Oil and acrylic on canvas, 85 x 123 cm, 2017
 Ohne Titel (blau), Oil and acrylic on canvas, 95 x 78 cm, 2016
 Untitled, Oil on canvas, 100 x 100 cm, 2014
 Offenes China, Oil on canvas, 120 x 80 cm, 2012
 Peristaltik, Oil on canvas, 200 x 200 cm, 2011

Bibliography 
Desire and Uproar Chinese-austrian Masterpieces 2016, English, 54 p., Edition Schütz, Beijing/New York/Vienna 2016
Wang Xiaosong, Unruly Ants, German/English/Chinese, 235 p., Hirmer Verlag, Munich 2012. Catalogue of the exhibition "Unkontrollierte Ameisen": 24 August - 15 September 2013, Künstlerhaus Wien
Le Nuove Opere Di Wang Xiaosong, Italian/English, 145 p., Palazzo Medici Riccardi, Florence, 2013. Catalogue of the exhibition "Breaking Boundaries": 8 August - 3 September 2013, Palazzo Medici Riccardi
Empty Layer - Collections of Wang Xiaosong, Hunan Fine Arts Publishing House, China, 2010
Collections of Wang Xiaosong (1992-2002), Hentrich & Hentrich Verlag, Germany, 2003
Pinocchio ist züruck ("Pinocchio has returned"), Shoten Publishers, Japan, 1998

See also 
 Berlin University of the Arts
 Zhejiang University

References

External links 
 Wang Xiaosong Official Website
 Wang Xiaosongs Seite, Schütz fine Art – Chinese Department
 Introspection

1964 births
Living people
Artists from Wuhan
Painters from Hebei